Kentare is a ward in Tarime District, Mara Region of northern Tanzania, East Africa. In 2016 the Tanzania National Bureau of Statistics report there were 10,455 people in the ward, from 9,475 in 2012.

Villages / neighborhoods 
The ward has 13 villages.
 Binagi
 Butirya
 Kedeli
 Kibumayi
 Kitatukya
 Kwigoronto
 Maruru
 Mogabiri centre
 Nsomba
 Nyagasara
 Nyamaisana
 Nyamasamore
 Nyamiobo

References

Tarime District
Mara Region